Kuznia na Rybalskomu is a ship building and armament company in Kyiv, Ukraine. Situated on the Dnieper River and presently concentrating on river ships, the company is also able to produce and repair small sea vessels (both civil and naval), as well as various military equipment.

Kuznia na Rybalskomu was indirectly controlled by Ukrainian businessman and politician Petro Poroshenko and politician Ihor Kononenko as of 2017.

In 2018, the company was bought by Serhiy Tihipko for $300 million.

The main production facilities of the company have been situated on the Rybalskyi Island in Kyiv since 1928. The shipyard specializes in shipbuilding, ship machines building, and propeller production. In the field of shipbuilding, the plant specializes in building medium fishing vessels, industrial ships and vessels of technical fleet, self-propelled and non-self-propelled barges. Machine building includes steam and hot-water automated boiler units, plate freezing apparatuses, and incinerators. Propeller production includes controllable-pitch propeller (CPP), blades, and lines of shafting.

History 
It was founded in 1862 by production engineer Fyodor Gregorevich Donat as a Joint Stock Company in the Russian Empire. It was mainly a mechanical plant and made different metal structures. For a short period of time (1889-1924), the plant was named "Kiev Machine-Building Plant" and in 1924, it was renamed to Leninska Kuznia. In 1928, by the Decree of Supreme Soviet Union Leninska Kuznia was made into a shipyard. During the Soviet period the LK shipyard also was known as the Ship-building Factory SSZ #302.

In 1995, the company completed a change in ownership and open-type joint Stock Company was set up named Leninska Kuznia Plant. The machine building sector still constitutes a high percentage in general scope of production.
In 2017 the plant changed its name to Kuznia na Rybalskomu (the Smithy on the Fishers' [Island]).

After 2014 
On January 30, 2015, it was announced that the plant had started production of two new armored vehicles: Tryton (literally Newt) and Arbalet (literally Crossbow) in accordance to NATO standards.

On November 10, 2015, the plant finished the first two Gyurza-M-class artillery boats for the Ukrainian Navy, which were later named "Ackerman" and "Berdyansk".

In June 2017, the plant finished artillery boats of Gyurza-M-class for the Ukrainian Navy, which were named "Vyshhorod", "Kremenchuk", "Lubny" and "Nikopol".

Production
 Gyurza-M-class artillery boat
 Grisha-class corvette
 Grisha I (5 vessels)
 MPK-52/U-210 "Kherson" built in 1968-71, transferred to Ukraine in 1997, decommissioned in 1997
 MPK-31 built in 1969-73, decommissioned in 1995
 MPK-127 built in 1974-76
 MPK-6 laid down in 1976, status uncertain
 MPK-44 "Komsomolets Latvii"/F11 "Zemaitis" laid down in 1977, transferred to Lithuania in 1992, delisted in 2008
 Grisha III (11 vessels)
 MPK-134 (MPK-64) "Kievskiy komsomolets"/"Muromets" built in 1980-82, renamed in 1992
 MPK-118 "Komsomolets Moldavii"/"Suzdalets" built in 1981-83, renamed in 1992
 MPK-139 built in 1982-84
 MPK-190 built in 1983-85
 MPK-199 "Komsomolets Armenii"/"Kasimov" built in 1984-85, renamed in 1992
 MPK-202 laid down in 1985, status uncertain
 MPK-113 laid down in 1985, status uncertain
 MPK-207 "Povorino" built in 1986-88
 MPK-217 "Eisk" built in 1987-89
 MPK-125 (MPK-214) "Leninskaya Kuznitsa"/"Sovetskaya Gavan" built in 1987-90, renamed in 1992
 MPK-82 built in 1989-91
 Grisha V (4 vessels, project 1124 MU by LK for Ukraine)
 U205 "Lutsk" built in 1992-93, captured by Russia in 2014
 U209 "Ternopil" built in 1991-02, captured by Russia in 2014
 U201 "Lviv" laid down in 1992, never finished
 "Zaporizka Sich" planned, never realized

Gallery

See also
 Sudnobudivna (Kyiv Metro)

References

External links 
Kuznya on Rybalsky Shipyard Public Website

 
Defence companies of Ukraine
Shipbuilding companies of Ukraine
Shipbuilding companies of the Soviet Union
Manufacturing companies based in Kyiv
Ukrainian brands
Transport in Kyiv